Pratt Creek is a river in Herkimer County in the state of New York. It flows into the Mohawk River near Frankfort.

Water quality
Water in the Pratt Creek watershed is moderately healthy.

References

Rivers of Herkimer County, New York
Mohawk River
Rivers of New York (state)